Lauter may refer to:

People
Lauter (surname)

Places
Lauter, Saxony, town in the district of Aue-Schwarzenberg, Saxony, Germany
Lauter, Bavaria, village in the district of Bamberg, Bavaria, Germany

Rivers
Lauter (Baunach), tributary to the Baunach in Bavaria, Germany
Lauter (Blau), tributary to the Blau in Baden-Württemberg, Germany
Lauter (Danube), or "Große Lauter", tributary to the Danube in Baden-Württemberg, Germany
Lauter (Fils), tributary to the Fils in Baden-Württemberg, Germany
Lauter (Glan), or "Waldlauter", tributary to the Glan in Rhineland-Palatinate, Germany
Lauter (Hasel), tributary to the Hasel in Thuringia, Germany
Lauter (Itz), tributary to the Itz in Bavaria, Germany
Lauter (Murr), tributary to the Murr in Baden-Württemberg, Germany
Lauter (Neckar), tributary to the Neckar in Baden-Württemberg, Germany
Lauter (Rhine), or "Wieslauter", tributary to the Rhine in Rhineland-Palatinate, Germany, and in Alsace, France
Lauter (Odenwald), tributary of the Rhine in Hesse, Germany, springs in the Odenwald
Lauter (Schlitz), tributary to the Schlitz in Hesse, Germany

See also
Lauder (disambiguation)
Lautering, process in brewing beer